Marie Rouget (Auxerre, 16 February 1883 – 23 December 1967) known by the pen-name Marie Noël was a French poet, a devout Catholic laywoman and officer of the Légion d'honneur. She was nominated for the Nobel Prize in Literature in 1960.

Works
Les Chansons et les Heures (1922)
Noël de l'Avent (1928)
Chants de la Merci (1930)
Le Rosaire des joies (1930)
Chants sauvages (1936)
Contes (1944)
Chants et psaumes d'automne (1947)
L'Âme en peine (1954)
L'Œuvre poétique, Stock (1956)
Notes intimes (1959)
Chants d’arrière saison (1961)
Le chant du chevalier (1969)
Le cru d'Auxerre (1967)
L'Œuvre en prose, Stock (1976)
Les Chansons et les Heures suivi de Le Rosaire des joies, Poésie/Gallimard, (1983)
Le chemin d'Anna Bargeton, Stock, (1986)
Almanach pour une jeune fille triste, Desclée de Brouwer, (2011)
ENGLISH TRANSLATION: Reflected Light, translated by Sara Elizabeth Woodruff, Pageant Press, 1964.  Contains selected poems from Les Chansons et les Heures, Les Chants de la Merci, Le Rosaire des Joies, Chants et Psaumes d'Automne and Chants d'Arriere Saison.  The book contains a brief 17 page commentary about Marie Noël.

References

1883 births
1967 deaths
French women poets
French Roman Catholic writers
20th-century French poets
20th-century French women writers
French Servants of God
20th-century venerated Christians
People from Auxerre
Officiers of the Légion d'honneur